William Carl Melford(March 28, 1876 – January 12, 1962) was an American football player and coach.  He served as the fourth head football coach at Washburn College—now known as Washburn University—in Topeka, Kansas and he held that position for the 1899 season. His coaching record at Washburn was 2–5–2.

Head coaching record

References

1876 births
1962 deaths
19th-century players of American football
American football centers
Nebraska Cornhuskers football players
Washburn Ichabods football coaches